Single malt may refer to:

 Single malt arrangement, a tax structure used by U.S. corporations in Ireland
 Single malt whisky, a malt whisky from a single distillery
 Single malt Scotch, a malt whisky from a single Scotch distillery